November 20 - Eastern Orthodox liturgical calendar - November 22

All fixed commemorations below are observed on December 4 by Eastern Orthodox Churches on the Old Calendar.

For November 21, Orthodox Churches on the Old Calendar commemorate the Saints listed on November 8.

Feasts
The Entry of the Most Holy Theotokos into the Temple.

Saints
—

Pre-Schism Western saints
 Saint Rufus of Rome, the disciple whom Saint Paul greets in Romans 16:13 (c. 90)
 Martyrs Celsus and Clement, in Rome.
 Martyrs Demetrius and Honorius, in Ostia in Italy.  (see also: December 22)
 Martyrs Honorius, Eutychius and Stephen, in Asta in Andalusia in Spain under Diocletian (c. 300)
 Saint Gelasius I, Pope of Rome (496)
 Saint Digain, son of Constantine Corneu, King of Dumnonia (5th century)
 Saint Maurus of Verona, twelfth Bishop of Verona, Confessor (c. 600)
 Venerable Columbanus of Bobbio, Abbot and founder of Luxeuil Abbey in Gaul, and Bobbio Abbey in Italy (615)  (see also: November 23 )
 Saint Amelberga of Susteren, Benedictine Abbess of Susteren Abbey in the Netherlands (c. 900)
 Saint Hilary, Benedictine Abbot of San Vincenzo in Volturno (1011-1045), who revived the monastic life there (c. 1045)

Post-Schism Orthodox saints
 Saint Yaropolk-Peter, Prince of Vladimir in Volhynia (11th century)  ( see also: November 22 )
 Venerable Sozomenos, Bishop of Karpaseia in Cyprus, and Wonderworker (12th century)  ( see also: November 20 )

New martyrs and confessors
 New Hieromartyr Alexander Hotovitsky, Protopresbyter, of New York and Moscow (1937)
 New Hieromartyr Alexis Benemansky of Tver, Priest (1937)  ( see also: November 22 )

Other commemorations
 Synaxis of churches that are dedicated to the Entrance of the Most Holy Theotokos.
 Icon of the Most Holy Theotokos "Everlasting Hope".
 Repose of Blessed Pasha of Birsk, Fool-for-Christ (1891)

Icon gallery

Notes

References

Sources
 November 21 / December 4. Orthodox Calendar (PRAVOSLAVIE.RU).
 December 4 / November 21. Holy Trinity Russian Orthodox Church (A parish of the Patriarchate of Moscow).
 November 21. OCA - The Lives of the Saints.
 The Autonomous Orthodox Metropolia of Western Europe and the Americas (ROCOR). St. Hilarion Calendar of Saints for the year of our Lord 2004. St. Hilarion Press (Austin, TX). p. 87.
 The Twenty-First Day of the Month of November. Orthodoxy in China.
 November 21. Latin Saints of the Orthodox Patriarchate of Rome.
 The Roman Martyrology. Transl. by the Archbishop of Baltimore. Last Edition, According to the Copy Printed at Rome in 1914. Revised Edition, with the Imprimatur of His Eminence Cardinal Gibbons. Baltimore: John Murphy Company, 1916. p. 359-360.
 Rev. Richard Stanton. A Menology of England and Wales, or, Brief Memorials of the Ancient British and English Saints Arranged According to the Calendar, Together with the Martyrs of the 16th and 17th Centuries. London: Burns & Oates, 1892. pp. 561–562.
Greek Sources
 Great Synaxaristes:  21 ΝΟΕΜΒΡΙΟΥ. ΜΕΓΑΣ ΣΥΝΑΞΑΡΙΣΤΗΣ.
  Συναξαριστής. 21 Νοεμβρίου. ECCLESIA.GR. (H ΕΚΚΛΗΣΙΑ ΤΗΣ ΕΛΛΑΔΟΣ). 
  21/11/2015. Ορθόδοξος Συναξαριστής. 
Russian Sources
  4 декабря (21 ноября). Православная Энциклопедия под редакцией Патриарха Московского и всея Руси Кирилла (электронная версия). (Orthodox Encyclopedia - Pravenc.ru).
  21 ноября по старому стилю / по новому стилю. Русская Православная Церковь - Православный церковный календарь на 2018 год.

November in the Eastern Orthodox calendar